Rare is the third studio album by American singer Selena Gomez, released on January 10, 2020, by Interscope Records. As the executive producer, Gomez worked with many producers, including Ian Kirkpatrick, Jason Evigan, Mattman & Robin, Sir Nolan, Simon Says, The Monsters & Strangerz and David Pramik. Described by Gomez as her "diary from the past few years", Rare is a midtempo pop and dance-pop record, taking cues from electronic, latin pop and R&B styles. Lyrically, the album explores themes of self-love, self-empowerment, self-acceptance, and self-worth. Guest features on Rare are from rappers 6lack and Kid Cudi.

The album was promoted by two singles prior to its release: The lead single "Lose You to Love Me" was released on October 23, 2019. The song topped the Billboard Hot 100 and became Gomez's first number-one single in the United States. "Look at Her Now" was released a day after the lead single, peaking at number 27 on the chart. Coinciding with the album release, the title track was made the third single, peaking at number 30 on the Hot 100. Rare was marketed as "#SG2", signifying Gomez's second album with Interscope. The album received positive reviews from music critics, who praised its production and cohesiveness, with many calling it Gomez's best album to date. Rare topped the charts in several countries, including Australia, Belgium, Canada, Mexico, Norway, Portugal, and Scotland.

Debuting atop the Billboard 200, Rare gave Gomez her third consecutive number-one album in the US. The Target-exclusive edition of Rare additionally includes five of Gomez's standalone singles released in 2017–18: "Bad Liar", "Fetish" featuring Gucci Mane, "It Ain't Me" with Kygo, "Back to You", and "Wolves" with Marshmello. The vinyl edition of Rare adds "Feel Me" as a bonus track. The deluxe edition with three new tracks, including the fourth single "Boyfriend", was released on April 9, 2020.

Background and release
Speaking in a November 2019 interview for Apple Music on the subject of her upcoming studio album Rare, Gomez admitted that the unreleased tracks were where she currently was. She also said that the songs on the tracklist went well with each other, after putting them in order.

Gomez appeared on the radio program On Air with Ryan Seacrest and stated that she had "a million ideas and it's just going to be cooler and it's going to be stronger and it's going to be better." She stated on The Tonight Show Starring Jimmy Fallon that the album would have a "sense of strong pop", and that she experimented with electric guitar. She also said that it took her "four years now to even feel at a good place with this album".

According to Semrush, Rare was one of 2020's three most-searched albums on Google, collecting 1.2 million monthly searches; the other two are Taylor Swift's Folklore and J Balvin's Colores.

Music and lyrics
Rare is primarily a pop and dance-pop record with a dark tone, deriving elements from various musical styles, such as R&B, electro, funk-pop, reggaeton, alternative pop and electronic music. The main themes are of "love, loss and dating". Gomez herself stated that the album is "honest, empowering and uplifting", while its main messages are "self-love, acceptance and empowerment". She also added that the songs on Rare are "the most honest music I've ever made".

Songs

The standard edition of Rare contains 13 tracks. The opener and title track is a "quiet but impactful self-love anthem" with lyrics discussing "the wavering interests of a lover" and the singer realizing "her love interest isn't valuing her in the way she deserves". Its sound has been referred to as "backing vocals and instrumentals muffled as if the whole thing has been dunked underwater". The following track, "Dance Again", is a blend of multiple genres, including funk, dance, electro, and electropop. It encompasses an "infectious" and "mellifluous" melody, "Cure-like" bass, "fuzzy" synths and a "walloping disco bassline". It has been described as "lite-Daft Punk" and "low-key yet deeply infectious". Co-written with Julia Michaels and Justin Tranter, "Look at Her Now" is an upbeat dance-pop and electropop track which explores "being better off without the bad ones" and getting over the end of a relationship. The fourth song, "Lose You to Love Me", is the only ballad on Rare. Its "bare-bones" production incorporates "plucked" violins, "booming" bass, "tearjerker" piano, an orchestra, and "multi-tracked Gomez voices cascading against each other". The song is about self-love and finding out one’s true self while losing a lover in the process. Critics speculated that it may reference about Gomez's relationship with Justin Bieber. The Latin-infused "Ring", which deals with "toying with noncommittal lovers", drew comparisons to the works of Camila Cabello (namely her 2017 hit single "Havana"), Gotye's "Somebody That I Used to Know", as well as Santana's "Smooth". Produced by the Monsters & Strangerz with Jon Bellion, "Vulnerable" is a "warm" disco and electropop record with a "moody synth groove" and elements of italo disco and tropical house.

Influences of Latin music are also present on the upbeat and "dancefloor-ready" "Let Me Get Me". The first of Rares two collaborations, "Crowded Room", is an R&B song which features singer 6lack. Tracks 10, 11, and 12 all have a funk sound. "Kinda Crazy" is a "tongue-in-cheek tune" and "sinuous kiss-off" driven by a "clean bluesy guitar lick and accompanying horns". "Cut You Off" is a "slinky" funk-inflected downtempo pop song and a slow jam about "saying goodbye to a relationship that's dragging you down". It has been compared to the works of Taylor Swift. Rare concludes with "A Sweeter Place": A collaboration with rapper Kid Cudi, the song "documents the life lessons [Gomez] has learned and expresses hope that brighter days lie ahead". The vinyl and digital bonus track editions of Rare feature the song "Feel Me", which was previously featured on the setlist of Gomez's 2016 Revival Tour. Gomez released the song on digital platforms on February 21, 2020, the day of the vinyl release.

Promotion
The album and its title were first announced on Gomez's Instagram page, where she revealed the cover art and included a snippet of the title track.

The standard edition of the studio album was promoted and preceded by the release of "Lose You to Love Me" released October 23, 2019, and "Look at Her Now" on October 24, 2019. On November 24, 2019, Gomez performed "Lose You to Love Me" and "Look at Her Now" at the 2019 American Music Awards to promote the album. The title track was released as the second single the same day the album came out. Gomez also appeared on The Tonight Show Starring Jimmy Fallon, The Ellen Degeneres Show, and The Kelly Clarkson Show to promote the album.

In addition, "Dance Again" was scheduled to be used to promote CBS Sports and Turner Sports' coverage of the 2020 NCAA tournament. However, the song was never used, as the event was canceled over concerns of the COVID-19 pandemic. A part of the proceeds from "Dance Again" went toward the MusiCares COVID-19 Relief Fund. A performance video of the track was posted on YouTube on March 26, 2020.

Critical reception

Rare received positive reviews from music critics. At Metacritic, which assigns a normalized rating out of 100 to reviews from mainstream critics, the album has an average score of 76 based on 12 reviews, indicating "generally favorable reviews".

Jem Aswad of Variety labeled Rare "one of the best pop albums to be released in recent memory" and described it as "sophisticated, precisely written and expertly produced music". While calling it "shockingly, and beautifully, upbeat", Brittany Spanos of Rolling Stone opined that the album is "an act of divine ruthlessness, full of dance-y, mid-tempo clarity". Writing for NME, Rhian Daly called the album "a beautifully confident return from one of pop's most underrated stars, and a quietly defiant wrestling back of the narrative surrounding her", while Leah Greenblatt of Entertainment Weekly praised the album's "lightness" despite its "heavy messaging".

Mikael Wood of the Los Angeles Times named Rare as Gomez's "most meaningful solo disc" and opined that it embraces "an infectious spirit of adventure". Similarly, Vultures Craig Jenkins wrote that the album is "almost inarguably Selena Gomez's best album". In a mixed review, Pitchforks Quinn Moreland stated that the album was her "most cohesive record to date" but that "[Gomez's] introspection can only go so deep when it's paired with sleek, easy songwriting that lets her slip by". In concurrence, Alexandra Pollard of The Independent gave the album three stars out of five, deeming it "an accomplished, coherent record, with moments of ecstasy and others of pathos" but concluding that it "never quite gets out from beneath the shadow of half a decade of behemothic bangers".

Idolator listed Rare among the 20 best pop albums of 2020, for being an "extraordinarily accomplished pop album that tackles serious issues like self worth and mental health" while complimenting "Lose You to Love Me" as a "Grammy-worthy ballad"; the tracks "Vulnerable", "Ring", "People You Know" and "A Sweeter Place" were highlighted as the "delights" from the album.

Year-end lists

Rare was featured on several year-end list of best albums. It was listed at number 30 on Uproxxs "The Best Albums of 2020" list, with the editors commenting "Coming into her adulthood necessarily meant facing down those two demons, and she does it with idiosyncratic lyrics, outstanding vocal performances, and earworm hooks." Rolling Stone ranked it at number 24 on "The Best Albums of 2020" list, with Julia Childing stating that "it’s cathartic to hear Gomez dump out the bad years like they’re just burned toast". The publication also listed "Cut You Off", a song from the album as the 19th best song of 2020. Billboard listed the title track as one of the best pop songs of 2020.

Accolades

Commercial performance
In the United States, Rare debuted at number one on the US Billboard 200, earning 112,000 album-equivalent units (including 53,000 copies as pure album sales) in its first week. This became Gomez's third US number-one debut and the first album released in the 2020s to top the chart. The album also accumulated a total of 79.3 million on-demand streams for album’s tracks that week. In its second week, the album dropped to number six on the chart, earning an additional 38,000 units. As of December 2020, the album has earned 703,000 album-equivalent units in the US, according to Nielsen Music/MRC Data. In July 2021, Rare had sold 123,000 pure copies in the US.

In the United Kingdom, the album debuted at number two on the UK Albums Chart earning 17,661 album-equivalent units in its first week. It became her highest-charting album in the country. In Australia, the album debuted at number one on the ARIA Top 100 Albums Chart, becoming Gomez's first number-one debut in the country. It also became her first number-one album in Argentina, Belgium (Flanders), Lithuania, Portugal and Scotland.

Track listing
Credits adapted from the album's liner notes.

Notes
  signifies a producer and vocal producer
  signifies a vocal producer
  signifies an additional producer
  signifies a co-producer
  signifies an additional vocal producer

Personnel 
Credits adapted from the liner notes of Rare.

Vocals 

 Selena Gomez – lead vocals , backing vocals 
 6lack – featured vocals 
 Kid Cudi – featured vocals, backing vocals 
 Caroline Ailin – backing vocals 
 Amy Allen – backing vocals 
 Chloe Angelides – backing vocals 
 Jon Bellion – backing vocals 
 Jason Evigan – backing vocals 
 Steph Jones – backing vocals 
 Ian Kirkpatrick – backing vocals 
 Madison Love – backing vocals 
 Mattman & Robin – backing vocals, choir vocals 
 MNEK – backing vocals 
 Julia Michaels – backing vocals , choir vocals 
 Liza Owen – backing vocals 
 Henry Oyekanmi – backing vocals 
 David Pramik – backing vocals 
 Avena Savage – backing vocals 
 Jasmine Thompson – backing vocals 
 Justin Tranter – backing vocals, choir vocals 
 Mark Williams – backing vocals

Instrumentation 

 Jon Bellion – instrumentation 
 Billboard – instrumentation 
 Carl Bodell – trumpet 
 David Bukovinszky – cello 
 Mattais Bylund – string synthesizer, string arrangement, string editing, string recording 
 Kid Cudi – instrumentation 
 Mike Dean – instrumentation 
 Jason Evigan – instrumentation 
 Jake Faun – instrumentation , guitar 
 Finneas – percussion, synths, strings, bass guitar 
 Kristoffer Fogelmark – keyboards, drums, instrumentation, guitar, bass 
 Alex Hope – instrumentation 
 Mattais Johansson – violin 
 Ian Kirkpatrick – instrumentation 
 Johan Lenox – string composition, string arrangement 
 Mattman & Robin – drums , guitar , percussion, bass , piano, synths , 808, organ, strings , keyboards, claps, harp 
 Albin Nedler – keyboards, drums, instrumentation, guitar 
 Sir Nolan – instrumentation , percussion 
 Oladipo Omishore – instrumentation 
 Henry Oyekanmi – percussion 
 David Pramik – instrumentation, Fender Stratocaster, Gibson Les Paul 
 Patrick Reynolds – instrumentation 
 Simon Says – instrumentation 
 The Monsters & Strangerz – instrumentation 
 Mark Williams – instrumentation 
 Rami Yacoub – keyboards, drums, instrumentation

Production 

 Selena Gomez – executive production
 Jon Bellion – production 
 Kid Cudi – production 
 Sean Douglas – production 
 Jason Evigan – production 
 Kristoffer Fogelmark – production 
 Ian Kirkpatrick – production, vocal production , co-production 
 Mattman & Robin – production, vocal production 
 Albin Nedler – production 
 Sir Nolan – production, vocal production 
 Ojivolta – production 
 David Pramik – production 
 Simon Says – production, vocal production , additional production 
 The Monsters & Strangerz – production 
 Rami Yacoub – production 
 Finneas – additional production 
 Johan Lenox – additional production 
 Billboard – co-production 
 Mike Dean  – co-production 
 Alex Hope – co-production 
 Oladipo Omishore – co-production 
 Patrick Reynolds – co-production 
 Benjamin Rice – vocal production 
 Bart Schoudel – vocal production 
 Gian Stone – additional vocal production

Technical 

 Cory Bice – engineering 
 Raul Cubina – engineering, programming 
 Ryan Dulude – engineering , assistant engineering 
 Rafael "Come2Brazil" Fadul – engineering 
 John Hanes – engineering , mix engineering 
 Sam Holland – engineering 
 Stefan Johnson – engineering 
 Ian Kirkpatrick – engineering 
 Jeremy Lertola – engineering 
 Mattman & Robin – engineering , programming 
 Sir Nolan – engineering , programming 
 David Pramik – engineering 
 Benjamin Rice – engineering 
 Simon Says – engineering 
 Bart Schoudel – engineering 
 William J. Sullivan – engineering 
 Mark Williams – engineering, programming 
 Bo Bodnar – assistant engineering 
 Andrew Boyd – assistant engineering 
 Kevin Brunhober – assistant engineering 
 Lionel Crasta – assistant engineering 
 Gavin Finn – assistant engineering 
 Chris Kahn – assistant engineering 
 Sedrick Moore II – assistant engineering 
 Mick Raskin – assistant engineering 
 Jeremy Tomlinson – assistant engineering 
 Finneas – programming 
 Kristoffer Fogelmark – programming 
 Albin Nedler – programming 
 Rami Yacoub – programming 
 Ben Dotson – post production vocal and sound editing 
 Jon Castelli – mixing 
 Serban Ghenea – mixing 
 Manny Marroquin – mixing 
 Tony Maserati – mixing 
 Miles Comaskey – mix engineering , assistant mix engineering 
 Josh Deguzman – mix engineering 
 Chris Galland – mix engineering 
 Scott Desmarais – assistant mix engineering 
 Robin Florent – assistant mix engineering 
 Jeremie Inhaber – assistant mix engineering 
 Najeeb Jones – assistant mix engineering 
 David Kim – assistant mix engineering 
 Dale Becker – mastering 
 Chris Gehringer – mastering 
 Will Quinnell – mastering

Design 
 Petra Collins – photography
 Max Angles – design
 Dina Hovsepian – art direction

Charts

Weekly charts

Year-end charts

Certifications and sales

Release history

See also
 List of 2020 albums
 List of Billboard 200 number-one albums of 2020
 List of number-one albums of 2020 (Australia)
 List of number-one albums of 2020 (Belgium)
 List of number-one albums of 2020 (Canada)

References

2020 albums
Albums produced by Finneas O'Connell
Albums recorded at Westlake Recording Studios
Interscope Records albums
Selena Gomez albums
Albums produced by Jon Bellion
Albums produced by Kid Cudi
Albums produced by Sean Douglas (songwriter)
Albums produced by Jason Evigan
Albums produced by Alex Hope (songwriter)
Albums produced by Jonas Jeberg
Albums produced by Ian Kirkpatrick (record producer)
Albums produced by Kygo
Albums produced by Marshmello
Albums produced by Kurtis McKenzie
Albums produced by David Pramik
Albums produced by Sir Nolan
Albums produced by Andrew Watt (record producer)
Albums produced by Rami Yacoub
Albums produced by Dot da Genius
Albums produced by Mike Dean (record producer)
Albums produced by Plain Pat